Municipal elections were held in France on 11 and 18 March 2001. These elections were marked by a setback for the left and a victory for the right one year before the 2002 presidential election. However, the capital, Paris and the second largest city, Lyon both switched to the left.

Following the second round, the right controlled 318 municipalities, the left 259.

The next elections were scheduled for 2007 but were rescheduled to 2008 not to interfere with legislative and presidential elections in 2007.

Results in Major Cities

Municipal Councillors of cities with 35,000+ population

Results by Party

Left (PS, PCF, Greens)

Communists

After the loss of Le Havre after the preceding municipal elections, the Communist Party lost the cities it managed to reconquer in 1995 (Ciotat, Sète, Nîmes) like some of its former bastions (Drancy, Argenteuil, Dieppe, Montluçon).

The gain of Sevran or Arles (from the Socialist Party) were not enough to reverse the progressive collapse of "municipal Communism", a tendency already started since the 1983 election (with the loss of Nîmes, Sète, Reims, Levallois-Perret, Antony, or Sèvres) and confirmed in 1989 with the loss of Amiens.

Socialists

As for the French Socialist Party lost in total 23 cities of more than thirty thousand inhabitants, whereas several party personalities undergo defeat in their respective towns. Catherine Trautmann, Minister of Culture, is not re-elected in Strasbourg, like Jack Lang in Blois. In Avignon, Élisabeth Guigou fails to unseat the RPR incumbent, Marie-Josée Roig. Martine Aubry becomes mayor of Lille only with 49.6% of the votes (and with a 53% abstention) in this city historically solid for the Socialists. Their victories in several cities such as Ajaccio, Auxerre (helped by the presence of two right-wing candidates in the second round), Dijon, or Salon-de-Provence, or in the major cities of Paris and Lyon, do not counterbalance the party's loses.

The Greens

The Green, progress importantly by the first round- they carry Saumur with over 50% by the first round. The Greens start to emerge as the second most important party in the "plural left" after the Socialist Party, to the disadvantage of the Communists. In Besançon, they obtain more than 16% of the votes.

In Paris and Lyon, their support of the PS in the second round contributes to the victory of the left there.

Far-Left (LO, LCR)

Workers' Struggle

Workers' Struggle ran 128 lists in 109 different cities, which won 4.37% of the votes, or 120,347 votes. LO obtained 33 councillors including 11 women, in 22 different cities, without amalgamating its lists with those of the plural left in the second round.

Revolutionary Communist League

Revolutionary Communist League ran or "supported" (according to their terms) 91 lists, common with various coalition partners. It obtained 4.52%, or 93,182 votes. By the first round, these lists obtained 26 elected officials. Several lists then amalgamated with lists of the plural left, including of the MDC.

Right (RPR, UDF, DL)

The parliamentary right compensated for the defeats it suffered in Lyon and Paris by important gains: it gained forty municipalities of more than 15,000 inhabitants in addition to those it already controlled, and gains from the left several towns of 30,000 inhabitants, including:

Strasbourg: victory of the list of Fabienne Keller (UDF) (with 50.85% of the votes) with over Catherine Trautmann, incumbent
Rouen: Pierre Albertini (UDF) won with 51.25% of the voices, against the outgoing mayor Yvon Robert (who won in 1995).
Aix-en-Provence: Maryse Joissains-Masini (DVD) won with 50.60% of the voices against 49.40% for Jean-François Picheral (PS), mayor since 1989
Nîmes: the Communist mayor Alain Clary (elected in 1995 in a four-way runoff) obtained only 44.33% of the votes, which elected Jean-Paul Fournier (RPR) with 55.66% of the voices).
Quimper: Alain Gerard (RPR) won the city (with 52.13% of the votes), from the Socialist Jean-Claude Joseph (47.87%).
Blois: Nicolas Perruchot (UDF) defeats the Minister for National Education Jack Lang by 37 votes(45.31% of the votes against 45.09%) in spite of the presence of the candidate of the FN.

It  holds the towns of Toulouse, Marseille and Nice with the victory of the lists led by Philippe Douste-Blazy in the first (55% of the votes), by Jean-Claude Gaudin in the second (48.5% of the votes) and by Jacques Peyrat in the last (44.48% of the votes).

Far-Right (FN, MNR)

In 1995, the candidates of the FN had carried the towns of Toulon, Marignane, Orange and later Vitrolles in 1997. In 2001, Jean-Marie Le Chevallier, mayor of Toulon (MNR, ex-FN) was beaten by the first round, obtaining only 7.78% of the votes. The mayor of Orange, Jacques Bompard (FN, now MPF) was re-elected by the first round and the mayor of Marignane, Daniel Simonpieri (MNR), by the second round with 62.52% of the votes, against 37.48% for Guy Martin (DL). In Vitrolles, Catherine Mégret (MNR) was initially re-elected with 45.32% of the voices against 44.07% for Domenica Tichadou (PS) but her election was invalidated afterwards. She was finally defeated by Guy Obino (PS) in 2002.

The strong presence of both MNR and FN lists in numerous cities caused the failure of many far-right candidates to reach the runoff, as many FN candidates had done in 1995.

2001
Municipal elections
Municipal elections